The Apollo Gyro AG1 is a Hungarian autogyro produced by Apollo Ultralight Aircraft of Eger and introduced in 2012. The aircraft is supplied ready-to-fly.

Design and development 
The aircraft features a carriage built on a welded stainless steel frame, with a fiberglass composite streamlined fairing, dual-controls, a two-seats-in-tandem, open cockpit, tricycle landing gear with wheel pants and a single engine in pusher configuration. The rotor is of aluminum alloy and includes a pneumatic pre-rotator.

The powerplant options include the four cylinder, liquid-cooled, four-stroke, dual-ignition  Rotax 912ULS engine, or the  turbo-charged Rotax 914 engine.

Originally an open-cockpit design with dual windshields, in 2013 a bubble canopy was introduced as an option. It weighs  and can be installed in five minutes.

Specifications (AG1)

References

External links 
 Official website

Light-sport aircraft
Single-engined pusher aircraft
Apollo Ultralight Aircraft aircraft